The Berlin Circle was a group that maintained logical empiricist views about philosophy.

History
Berlin Circle was created in the late 1920s by Hans Reichenbach, Kurt Grelling and Walter Dubislav and composed of philosophers and scientists such as Carl Gustav Hempel, David Hilbert and Richard von Mises. Its original name was Die Gesellschaft für empirische Philosophie, which in English may be translated as "the society for empirical philosophy". Together with the Vienna Circle, they published the journal Erkenntnis ("Knowledge") edited by Rudolf Carnap and Reichenbach, and organized several congresses and colloquia concerning the philosophy of science, the first of which was held in Prague in 1929.

The Berlin Circle had much in common with the Vienna Circle, but the philosophies of the circles differed on a few subjects, such as probability and conventionalism. Reichenbach insisted on calling his philosophy logical empiricism, to distinguish it from the logical positivism of the Vienna Circle. Few people today make the distinction, and the words are often used interchangeably.

Members of the Berlin Circle were particularly active in analyzing the philosophical and logical consequences of the advances in contemporary physics, especially the theory of relativity. Apart from that, they denied the soundness of metaphysics and traditional philosophy and asserted that many philosophical problems are indeed meaningless.

After the rise of Nazism, several of the group's members emigrated to other countries, including Reichenbach, who moved to Turkey in 1933  and later to the United States in 1938; Dubislav emigrated to Prague in 1936; Hempel moved to Belgium in 1934 and later to the United States in 1939; and Grelling was killed in a concentration camp. A younger member of the Berlin Circle or Berlin School to leave Germany was Olaf Helmer who joined the RAND Corporation and played an important role in the development of the Delphi method used for predicting future trends, and other early forms of social technology.

After emigrating to various countries the group effectively came to an end, but not without influencing a wide range of philosophers of the 20th century, its method having been especially influential on analytic philosophy and futurology.

References

Logical positivism
1930s in Berlin
Philosophy of science
Weimar culture